Ystalyfera railway station served the village of Ystalyfera, in the historical county of Glamorganshire, Wales, from 1861 to 1950 on the Swansea Vale Railway.

History 
The station was opened on 20 November 1861 by the Swansea Vale Railway. It closed on 25 September 1950.

References 

Disused railway stations in Neath Port Talbot
Railway stations in Great Britain opened in 1861
Railway stations in Great Britain closed in 1950
1861 establishments in Wales
1950 disestablishments in Wales